Haut-Madawaska is a town in the New Brunswick Panhandle, Canada, formed by amalgamating the previous incorporated rural community of the same name with the village of Lac Baker. The town includes the former incorporated villages of Lac Baker, Baker-Brook, Clair, Saint-François de Madawaska and Saint-Hilaire.

Revised census figures for the new town have not been released; 2021 figures are for the rural community.

History 

In a 2016 plebiscite, the residents of five local service districts (the parishes of Baker Brook, Clair, Lac Baker, Saint-François, and Saint-Hilaire), part of a sixth local service district (the parish of Madawaska) and four villages (Baker Brook, Clair, Saint-François de Madawaska and Saint-Hilaire) voted 493 to 299 in favour of incorporating a new rural community under the name of Haut-Madawaska. The incorporation took effect July 1, 2017. The plebiscite was the second in as many years. In 2015, a similar plebiscite was held that also included a fifth village, Lac Baker. The residents of all communities involved voted in favour of incorporation as a rural community with the exception of Lac Baker's residents, thereby defeating the proposal. As a result of the 2023 New Brunswick local governance reform, Lac Baker was amalgamated with the rest of Haut-Madawaska in 2023.

Economy 
The region's economy is focused on two industry sectors with some of the main players outlined below:

1) Food industry (Saint-François-de-Madawaska is known as the province's Chicken Capital)

 Groupe Westco (an integrated poultry 
 Nadeau Poultry (a poultry processing plant, part of the Maple Lodge Farms company)
 Sunnymel (a poultry processing plant, partnership between Groupe Westco and Olymel)
 Les Industries Corriveau (a processing plant for buckwheat flour)

2) Wood products (part of the Northern New Brunswick wood products cluster)

 JD Irving Hardwoods (a hardwood grading and kiln drying facility, part of the JD Irving Group)
 Waska (a manufacturer of cedar shingles)
 JMN Enterprises (a manufacturer of kitchen accessories, BBQ accessories, and hardwood components)
 Fiready (a manufacturer of kiln dried firewood)
 Canusa Cedar (a manufacturer of cedar shingles)

The region is known for its hardworking labor and close to full employment with recurring periods of zero or negative unemployment.

Demographics 

Government 
The current mayor is Jean-Pierre Ouellet (a former minister in the provincial government).

See also 
List of communities in New Brunswick
List of municipalities in New Brunswick

References

External links 

Communities in Madawaska County, New Brunswick
Rural communities in New Brunswick